The United States census of 1790 was the first census of the whole United States. It recorded the population of the United States as of Census Day, August 2, 1790, as mandated by Article I, Section 2 of the United States Constitution and applicable laws. In the first census, the population of the United States was enumerated to be 3,929,214.

Congress assigned responsibility for the 1790 census to the marshals of United States judicial districts under an act, which with minor modifications and extensions, governed census taking until the 1840 census. "The law required that every household be visited, that completed census schedules be posted in 'two of the most public places within [each jurisdiction], there to remain for the inspection of all concerned...' and that 'the aggregate amount of each description of persons' for every district be transmitted to the president."

Contemporary perception
Both Secretary of State Thomas Jefferson and President George Washington expressed skepticism over the results, believing that the true population had been undercounted.  If indeed an undercount was the result, possible explanations for it include dispersed population, poor transportation links, limitations of contemporary technology, and individual refusal to participate.

Loss of data
Although the census was proved statistically factual, based on data collected, the records for several states (including Delaware, Georgia, New Jersey, and Virginia) were lost sometime between 1790 and 1830.  Almost one-third of the original census data have been lost or destroyed since their original documentation.  These include some 1790 data from: Connecticut, Maine, Maryland, Massachusetts, New Hampshire, New York, North Carolina, Pennsylvania, Rhode Island, South Carolina, and Vermont; the validity and existence of most of these data, though, can be confirmed in many secondary sources pertaining to the first census.

Data availability
No microdata from the 1790 population census are available, but aggregate data for small areas, together with compatible cartographic boundary files, can be downloaded from the National Historical Geographic Information System.

Data
Census data included the name of the head of the family and categorized inhabitants as follows: free white males at least 16 years of age (to assess the country's industrial and military potential), free white males under 16 years of age, free white females, all other free persons (reported by sex and color), and slaves.  Under the direction of the Secretary of State Thomas Jefferson, marshals collected data from all thirteen states (Connecticut, Delaware, Georgia, Maryland, Massachusetts, New Hampshire, New Jersey, New York, North Carolina, Pennsylvania, Rhode Island, South Carolina, and Virginia), and from Maine and the Southwest Territory. The census was not conducted in Vermont until 1791, after that state's admission to the Union as the 14th state on March 4 of that year.  (From 1777 until early 1791, and hence during all of 1790, Vermont was a de facto independent country whose government took the position that Vermont was not then a part of the United States.)

At 17.8 percent, the 1790 census's proportion of slaves to the free population was the highest ever recorded by any census of the United States.

City rankings

References

External links

 Historic US Census data
 1790 Census of Population and Housing official reports
 Population of 24 Urban Places: 1790
 

Census, 1790
1st United States Congress
United States census
United States